Štirovica is a historical village located within the boundaries of the present-day village of Brodec in the municipality of Gostivar, North Macedonia. It is part of the region of Upper Reka.

History
Štirovica (Shterovica) appears in the Ottoman defter of 1467 as a village in the ziamet of Reka which was under the authority of Karagöz Bey. The village had a total of 11 households and the anthroponymy recorded depicts a predominantely Albanian character.  

According to Ethnography of the Adrianople, Monastir and Salonika vilayets, Štirovica in 1873 had 100 households with 235 Albanian Muslims. In statistics gathered by Vasil Kanchov in 1900, the village was inhabited by 400 Muslim Albanians.

Due to uprisings in the Upper Reka region, Štirovica was burned down by Serbian and Bulgarian forces between 1912–1916.

Notable people
Bajazid Doda, ethnographic writer and photographer

Gallery

References

Villages in Gostivar Municipality
Albanian communities in North Macedonia